Asclerini is a tribe of false blister beetles in the family Oedemeridae. There are more than 40 genera and over 200 described species in Asclerini.

Genera
These 42 genera belong to the tribe Asclerini:

 Afrochitona
 Alloxantha Seidlitz, 1899
 Anacerdochroa Svihla, 1986
 Ananca Fairmaire & Germain, 1863
 Apterosessinia Blair, 1926
 Asclerosibutia Pic, 1914
 Baculipalpus Broun, 1880
 Chitona W.Schmidt, 1844
 Colobostomoides Svihla, 1983
 Copidita LeConte, 1866
 Diplectrus Kirsch, 1866
 Ditylomorphula Svihla, 1986
 Ditylomorphus Svihla, 1986
 Dohrnia Malm, 1874
 Eobia Semenov, 1894
 Eumecomera Arnett, 1951
 Heliocis Arnett, 1951
 Hypasclera Kirsch, 1866
 Indasclera Svihla, 1980
 Ischnomera Stephens, 1832
 Koniaphassa Hudson, 1975
 Mecopselaphus Solier, 1849
 Melananthia Blair, 1926
 Melananthoides Vazquez, 1996
 Microsessinia Pic, 1922
 Nacatrorus Vazquez, 1996
 Nacerdochroa Reitter, 1893
 Oxacis LeConte, 1866
 Oxycopis Arnett, 1951
 Parisopalpus Hudson, 1975
 Paroxacis Arnett, 1951
 Platylytra Fairmaire & Germain, 1863
 Probosca W.Schmidt, 1846
 Pseudohyperasclera
 Pseudolycus Guérin, 1833
 Rhinoplatia Horn, 1868
 Selenopalpus White, 1846
 Sessinia Pascoe, 1863
 Sisenes Champion, 1889
 Thelyphassa Pascoe, 1876
 Vasaces Champion, 1889
 Xanthochroina Ganglbauer, 1881

References

Oedemeridae